Ganbaataryn Narantsetseg (born 21 January 1995) is a Mongolian judoka.

She is the silver medallist of the 2019 Judo World Masters in the -48 kg category.

References

External links
 

1995 births
Living people
Mongolian female judoka
Asian Games medalists in sambo
Sambo practitioners at the 2018 Asian Games
Medalists at the 2018 Asian Games
Asian Games gold medalists for Mongolia
21st-century Mongolian women